Hurricane Genevieve, also referred to as Typhoon Genevieve, was the first tropical cyclone to track across all three northern Pacific basins since Hurricane Dora in 1999. Genevieve developed from a tropical wave into the eighth tropical storm of the 2014 Pacific hurricane season well east-southeast of Hawaii on July 25. However, increased vertical wind shear caused it to weaken into a tropical depression by the following day and degenerate into a remnant low on July 28. Late on July 29, the system regenerated into a tropical depression, but it weakened into a remnant low again on July 31, owing to vertical wind shear and dry air.

The remnants redeveloped into a tropical depression and briefly became a tropical storm south of Hawaii on August 2, yet it weakened back into a tropical depression soon afterwards. Late on August 5, Genevieve re-intensified into a tropical storm, and intensified into a Category 1 hurricane on the next day when undergoing rapid deepening because of favorable conditions. Early on August 7, Genevieve strengthened into a Category 4 hurricane, shortly before it crossed the International Date Line and was reclassified as a typhoon, also becoming the thirteenth named storm of the 2014 Pacific typhoon season. Late on the same day, Genevieve reached peak intensity while it was located west-southwest of Wake Island.

Typhoon Genevieve started to gradually weaken at noon on August 8, and stronger vertical wind shear provided by a TUTT cell began to weaken the system further on August 9. The typhoon crossed 30° north at noon on August 10 and weakened to a severe tropical storm soon afterwards, because of unfavorable sea surface temperature and expanding subsidence. Genevieve weakened into a tropical storm on August 11 and a tropical depression the following day, as its deep convection diminished. On August 13, the system turned northeastward, before degenerating into a post-tropical cyclone on August 14, with the JMA reporting the system to have dissipated. However, the Ocean Prediction Center (OPC) tracked Genevieve's remnants for another day, which crossed over the International Date Line again, until they were absorbed by another extratropical cyclone on August 15.

Meteorological history

Origin and regeneration

The National Hurricane Center (NHC) began to monitor a tropical wave associated with a few showers and thunderstorms, moving westward off the coast of northern Central America on July 17. Four days later, thunderstorm activity became more concentrated; by July 22, the area of low-pressure became better organized. On July 23, the NHC noted that the system could become a tropical depression within the next two days; however, they also noted that wind shear could increase within a couple of days. Following an increase of deep convection developing near the center as well as the collection of ASCAT data showing an area of tropical storm-force winds, the NHC upgraded the system to Tropical Storm Genevieve on July 25.

Shortly afterward, increased wind shear took its toll on the system, causing Genevieve to lose its organization as it continued westward, under the influence of a subtropical ridge and the Intertropical Convergence Zone. After the low-level center of circulation was exposed and became separated from the deep convection, the NHC subsequently downgraded it to a tropical depression on July 26. Although deep convection increased near the center early on the next day, Genevieve continued to battle westerly shear when crossing 140°W, moving into the waters monitored by the Central Pacific Hurricane Center (CPHC). Due to the lack of deep convection, the CPHC indicated that Genevieve had become a remnant low early on July 28, as only a low-level cloud swirl remained. However, the CPHC noted the possibility of re-development since shear was forecast to decrease.

Roughly 36 hours later, the remnants of Genevieve regenerated into a tropical depression to the southeast of the main Hawaiian Islands. The system briefly became better organized on July 30, prompting the CPHC to forecast the storm would re-intensify into a tropical storm. However, by the end of the day, the low-level circulation center had become displaced to the east of the deep convection due to increased southeasterly shear and infiltration of dry air. By 21:00 UTC July 31, the CPHC reported that Genevieve had once again degenerated to a remnant low, as only an isolated area of deep convection remained west of the center.

Intensification and peak intensity
The remnants of Genevieve continued to travel in a generally westward direction, moving into an environment more conducive for tropical cyclogenesis, and on the afternoon of August 2, Genevieve regenerated into a tropical depression, as the storm reacquired deep convection and its upper-level outflow pattern improved. By 21:00 UTC the same day, Genevieve reacquired tropical storm intensity, continuing to travel westward around the subtropical ridge to its north, but only six hours later, the CPHC downgraded Genevieve into a tropical depression. Deep convection near the center waxed and waned several times, but Genevieve failed to re-intensify. After moving west-southwest, Genevieve turned west-northwest on August 4 as it continued to track around the ridge to its north.

Despite moderate wind shear, convection soon wrapped around the southeastern side of the low-level circulation. By 21:00 UTC on August 5, the CPHC upgraded the system to a tropical storm, despite continued wind shear. Wind shear quickly decreased, triggering a period of rapid intensification. By the afternoon of August 6, Genevieve intensified to a low-end Category 1 hurricane; the system also developed a central dense overcast and well-organized banding around the newly-developed eye. Traversing over very warm sea surface temperatures, the intensification rate accelerated that evening.

Genevieve crossed the International Date Line at 06:00 UTC on August 7, entering the area of responsibility of the RSMC Tokyo operated by the Japan Meteorological Agency (JMA). The Joint Typhoon Warning Center (JTWC) also upgraded Genevieve to a super typhoon, based on the compact and symmetric ring of uniform convection embedded with a  eye, as well as excellent poleward outflow into the strong tropical upper tropospheric trough (TUTT) positioned to the north and northeast.

Demise
During the morning of August 8, Genevieve started to track northward along the western periphery of a deep-layered subtropical ridge positioned to the east and northeast. Although the typhoon remained compact at noon, more fragmented deep convective banding revealed that Genevieve had begun a weakening trend. As the result, the JTWC downgraded Genevieve to a typhoon late on the same day, due to warmer convection surrounding the system. Therefore, the eye of the typhoon became cloud-filled, while the deepest convection around the core was also becoming warmer. The system began to track north-northwestward in the afternoon, when the cold dense overcast has decreased in size and become less symmetric.

Genevieve reformed a  eye with more symmetric and organized convection for short time early on August 10, but the eye disappeared very soon as the system elongated more. Upper-level analysis indicated a complex environment— an anticyclone located to the southeast, a TUTT cell to the west, and a second anticyclone to the north. The TUTT cell and the first anticyclone caused strong upper-level southwestern flow and moderate vertical wind shear over the system, but the issues were offset by the quick speed of the typhoon. At the same time, a digging trough was expanding the region of subsidence which isolated the core from the tropical moisture along the equatorward periphery. Later, deep convection along the tightly-wrapped low-level circulation center of the typhoon rapidly diminished as dry air surrounded the system.

Dry air, cool ocean temperatures and a rapid weakening of the linkage to tropical moisture made deep convection over the storm almost completely dissipate. This process was hastened by the disintegration of the TUTT cell which had helped to enhance equatorward outflow. Under the combination of many unfavorable
environmental factors, the JMA downgraded the rapidly weakening system to a tropical storm, when it started to move west-northwestward and slowed down at noon. Owing to diminished convection associated with a weak low-level circulation center, the JTWC issued its final warning and downgraded Genevieve to a tropical depression late on the same day.

After the JMA downgraded Genevieve to a tropical depression at 06:00 UTC on August 12, the system drifted westward and then northwestward very slowly until it accelerated northeastward late on August 13. The JMA reported that Genevieve had dissipated as a tropical depression before noon on August 14; however, the Ocean Prediction Center indicated that this post-tropical cyclone crossed the International Date Line and entered the Central North Pacific Ocean again late on the same day. The remnants of Genevieve were eventually absorbed by another extratropical cyclone before noon on August 15.

See also

 Other tropical cyclones named Genevieve
 Hurricane John (1994)
 Hurricane Dora (1999)
 Hurricane Jimena (2003)
 Hurricane Ioke (2006)
 Hurricane Hector (2018)

References

External links 

NHC Advisory Archive of Hurricane Genevieve
CPHC Product Archive of Hurricane Genevieve
JMA General Information of Typhoon Genevieve (1413) from Digital Typhoon
JMA Best Track Data of Typhoon Genevieve (1413) 
07E.GENEVIEVE from the U.S. Fleet Numerical Meteorology and Oceanography Center

2014 Pacific hurricane season
2014 Pacific typhoon season
Typhoons
Category 3 Pacific hurricanes

Genevieve